Bill Yeagle (born 1938) is a former American football player and coach. He served as the head football coach at Salisbury State College—now known as Salisbury University—in Salisbury, Maryland from 1979 to 1981, compiling a record of 18–11–1. Yeagle played college football at the University of Tampa. He was an assistant football coach at the University of Wisconsin–Eau Claire for 11 years prior to being hired at Salisbury State.

References

1938 births
Living people
American football defensive backs
American football tight ends
Salisbury Sea Gulls football coaches
Tampa Spartans football players
Wisconsin–Eau Claire Blugolds football coaches
High school football coaches in Wisconsin
College wrestling coaches in the United States